

Map

List

, China Airlines is the largest airline in and the flag carrier of Taiwan (the Republic of China). The airline operates over 1,300 flights weekly to 95(+1) airports in 91(+1) cities across Asia, North America, Europe, and Oceania (brackets indicate future destinations) (excluding codeshare). Airports with China Airlines operations are listed below.

References

External links
 China Airlines list of destinations : https://web.archive.org/web/20101203034205/http://www.china-airlines.com/en/about/about.htm
 China Airlines global route map : https://web.archive.org/web/20130129085409/http://www.china-airlines.com/ch/cinfs/eroutec.htm

Lists of airline destinations
SkyTeam destinations
Destinations